The Eighth Battle of the Isonzo was fought from October 10–12, 1916 between Italy and Austria-Hungary.

Battle 
The Eighth Battle of the Isonzo, fought briefly from 10–12 October 1916, was essentially a continuation of attempts made during the Seventh Battle of the Isonzo (14–17 September 1916) to extend the bridgehead established at Gorizia during the Sixth Battle of the Isonzo in August 1916.

Italian Chief of Staff Luigi Cadorna was determined to continue Italian attacks to the left of the town, a policy that continued during the following (ninth) battle - with an equal lack of success.

As with the earlier, Seventh, attack, heavy Italian casualties required that the short, sharp concentrated initiative be called off pending the army's recuperation.

The seemingly interminable Isonzo onslaught was next renewed with the Ninth Battle of the Isonzo on 1 November 1916, the fifth and final attack of the year.

Italian architect Antonio Sant'Elia, a key member of the Futurist movement in architecture, was killed during the battle.

See also
First Battle of the Isonzo - 23 June 1915 – 7 July 1915
Second Battle of the Isonzo - 18 July 1915 – 3 August 1915
Third Battle of the Isonzo - 18 October 1915 – 3 November 1915
Fourth Battle of the Isonzo - 10 November 1915 – 2 December 1915
Fifth Battle of the Isonzo - 9–17 March 1916
Sixth Battle of the Isonzo - 6–17 August 1916
Seventh Battle of the Isonzo - 14–17 September 1916
Ninth Battle of the Isonzo - 1–4 November 1916
Tenth Battle of the Isonzo - 12 May 1917 – 8 June 1917
Eleventh Battle of the Isonzo - 19 August 1917 – 12 September 1917
Twelfth Battle of the Isonzo - 24 October 1917 – 7 November 1917 also known as the Battle of Caporetto

References

Further reading

External links
FirstWorldWar.Com: The Battles of the Isonzo, 1915-17
Battlefield Maps: Italian Front
11 battles at the Isonzo
The Walks of Peace in the Soča Region Foundation. The Foundation preserves, restores and presents the historical and cultural heritage of the First World War in the area of the Isonzo Front for the study, tourist and educational purposes.
The Kobarid Museum (in English)
Društvo Soška Fronta (in Slovenian)
Pro Hereditate - extensive site (in En/It/Sl)

Isonzo 08
Isonzo 08
Isonzo 08
Isonzo 08
the Isonzo
1916 in Italy
1916 in Austria-Hungary
October 1916 events